The 17th Rifle Division was an infantry division of the Soviet Union's Red Army during World War II.

First Formation
The division was first formed on 23 October 1918 from the 1st Vitebsk Rifle Division and 2nd Smolensk Rifle Division by the order of the Military council of the Smolensk Defensive Region.  The division participated in the Russian Civil War in Lithuania, Ukraine and Belorussia.  After the civil war the division participated in the Polish–Soviet War.  The division was stationed along the Brezina River in 1920.  The  division was garrisoned at Nizhny Novgorod (renamed Gorky in 1932) from 1920 to 1939.  In 1939 the division was broken up and used to form three divisions, the new 17th, 136th  and the 137th Rifle Divisions. The new 17th Rifle Division, formed from the 49th Rifle Regiment, continued the traditions of the original 17th.

Composition
 49th Rifle Regiment
 50th Rifle Regiment
 51st Rifle Regiment
 17th Artillery Regiment

The division was maintained on a reduced status until December 1939 when the division was brought to full strength for the Winter War with Finland.  The division returned to Gorky in April 1940.  In June 1940 the division was moved to the Lithuanian border and assigned to the Belorussian Military District.

Assigned to 21st Rifle Corps, 10th Army when the Germans invaded the Soviet Union in June 1941 and located in the Vitebsk and Polotsk area.  By the end of June the division was surrounded in the area east of Minsk.  Though the division was destroyed in late June 1941 it was not officially disbanded until 19 September 1941.

Composition
 55th Rifle Regiment
 271st Rifle Regiment
 278th Rifle Regiment
 20th Artillery Regiment
 35th Howitzer Regiment (never formed)
 390th Howitzer Regiment (added April 1940)

Second Formation
Reformed from the 17th Moscow People's Militia Rifle Division on 26 October 1941.  Assigned to the 33rd Army, Reserve Front.  In November 1941 it was assigned to the 43rd Army, Western Front where it participated in the Moscow Counteroffensive.  The division remained in the Western Front until the summer of 1943.  In late July 1943 the division participated in the Orel Strategic Counter-offensive Operation and in late August was transferred to the Bryansk Front.  Reassigned to the 53rd Rifle Corps, 48th Army, 1st Belorussian Front in February 1944.  The division stayed with this Corps and Army until the end of the war.  In June 1944 the division took part in Operation Bagration and the liberation of Bobruisk, Belorussia.  From February to April 1945 the division participated in the East Prussian Offensive ending the war there as part of the occupation forces assigned to the Northern Group of Forces.

After a brief period on occupation duty the division was returned to the Soviet Union in the Volga Military District at Yoshkar-Ola where it was reorganized as the 1st Rifle Brigade as part of the 53rd Rifle Corps. It was disbanded in March 1947.

Composition

See also
 List of infantry divisions of the Soviet Union 1917–1957

References

Citations

Bibliography 

017
017
Military units and formations awarded the Order of the Red Banner
Military units and formations of the Soviet Union in the Winter War

ru:17-я стрелковая дивизия (1-го формирования)